The Reno National Bank-First Interstate Bank, at 204 N. Virginia St. in Reno, Nevada, is a Classical Revival building that was built in 1915.  It was designed by architect Frederick J. DeLongchamps.
It was listed on the National Register of Historic Places in 1986. It was listed as part of a Thematic Resources study of the architecture of DeLongchamps.

The former bank has been transformed to hold restaurant space in the Harrah's Reno casino resort.

References 

Commercial buildings completed in 1915
Buildings and structures in Washoe County, Nevada
Bank buildings on the National Register of Historic Places in Nevada
Frederic Joseph DeLongchamps buildings
National Register of Historic Places in Reno, Nevada